is a Japanese judoka.

He participated at the 2018 World Judo Championships, winning a medal.

References

External links
 

1997 births
Living people
Japanese male judoka
World judo champions
Universiade gold medalists for Japan
Universiade medalists in judo
Medalists at the 2017 Summer Universiade
20th-century Japanese people
21st-century Japanese people